Microbacterium fluvii is a Gram-positive bacterium from the genus Microbacterium which has been isolated from driftwood from the Maera River from Japan's Iriomote Island.

References

External links
Type strain of Microbacterium fluvii at BacDive -  the Bacterial Diversity Metadatabase	

Bacteria described in 2008
fluvii